The 1832 United States presidential election in Indiana took place between November 2 and December 5, 1832, as part of the 1832 United States presidential election. Voters chose nine representatives, or electors to the Electoral College, who voted for President and Vice President.

Indiana voted for the Democratic Party candidate, Andrew Jackson, over the National Republican candidate, Henry Clay. Jackson won Indiana by a margin of 34.20%.

As of 2020, this remains the strongest performance by a Democrat in Indiana.

Results

See also
 United States presidential elections in Indiana

References

Indiana
1832
1832 Indiana elections